Klinsky District is an administrative and municipal district (raion), one of the thirty-six in Moscow Oblast, Russia. It is located in the northwest of the oblast and borders with Tver Oblast in the north, Lotoshinsky District in the northwest, Volokolamsky District in the west, Istrinsky District in the south, Solnechnogorsky District in the southeast, and with Dmitrovsky District in the east. Its administrative center is the town of Klin. Population:  127,938 (2002 Census);  The population of Klin accounts for 63.1% of the district's total population.

Geography
The northern part of the district is mostly flat, while the southern part is mostly hilly. About half of the district's territory is covered by forests. The Sestra River flows through the district.

History
The district was established in 1929.

Attractions
Tchaikovsky House-Museum

References

Notes

Sources

Districts of Moscow Oblast